Mercedes-AMG SL is the name given to two automobiles:
Mercedes-Benz SL-Class (R231)
Mercedes-AMG SL-Class (R232)